Pongpisuth Pue-on  is a Thai retired football player who played as a striker. He father was once of the thai football legend Piyapong Pue-on and mother name is Somkid Pue-on. He born 18 October 1985. He nickname is Tangmo. He started play football since 9 years. He studied at the Bangkok Christian College and Suankularb Wittayalai School until secondary 4 and get quota of Football Association of Thailand and Adidas give to studied at Middlesbrough College in England for 3 years. and comeback Thailand in 2004.

Early life 
Pongpisuth graduate with Sripatum University and now Pongpisuth stop playing professional football due to Chronic knee pain.

References

External sources 
 ก้าวต่อไปของ ‘พงษ์พิสุทธิ์ ผิวอ่อน’ สายเลือดใหม่วงการฟุตบอลไทย
 ประวัติ พงษ์พิสุทธิ์ ผิวอ่อน จากคอลัมน์ รู้ไปโม้ด
 เวทีคนเก่ง สยามรัฐ 
 เด็กเด็ดเด็ด ไทยรัฐ

Association football forwards
Pongpisuth Pue-on
Pongpisuth Pue-on
Living people
1985 births
Thai expatriate sportspeople in Singapore
Thai expatriate sportspeople in England
Gombak United FC players
Singapore Premier League players